Thomas Karlsson (born 1972) is a Swedish occultist and esoteric writer, with a PhD in the History of Religions from Stockholm University. In 1989 he founded  Dragon Rouge, a Left-Hand Path initiatory organisation.

Occultism
In 1989, Thomas Karlsson and six other magicians founded Dragon Rouge, a Left-Hand Path initiatory organisation and a Draconian Tradition Order, led by Karlsson. As a book author, he concentrates on occult, philosophy, and paranormal topics. The Dragon Rouge website cites Carlos Castaneda, Julius Evola, and Kenneth Grant as some of the magical writers whose work is read by the order, as are texts by classical philosophers such as Herakleitos, Plato, and Plotinos, as well as modern philosophers like Friedrich Nietzsche, Martin Heidegger, and Henri Bergson. His personal influences include Sumerian mythology, alchemy, tantra, the Goetia, and the Qliphoth. In an interview dated in 2003, he claims he experienced astral projections as a child, but did not think of them as supernatural experiences until he started formally exploring the occult. In his book Amongst Mystics and Magicians in Stockholm (2012), he describes experiences he had in the years 1989–1991 which are related to the establishment of Dragon Rouge. The book exhibits Karlsson's influences from people such as Aleister Crowley, Grant and Anton LaVey.

Music 
Karlsson was the lyricist of symphonic metal band Therion, and wrote almost all the band's lyrics between 1996 and 2010; however, Karlsson was never regarded as an official band member. 

He was also the lead vocalist of the dark wave music project, Shadowseeds.

Books 
Uthark - Nightside of the Runes.
 a.k.a. Uthark - Im Schattenreich der Runen (German title) — incl. Therion-CD Secret of the Runes
Kabbala, kliffot och den goetiska magin
 a.k.a. Qabalah, Qliphoth and Goetic Magic (English title)
 a.k.a. La Kabbala e la magia goetica (Italian title)
 a.k.a. Kabbalah, Qliphoth und die Goetische Magie (German title)
 a.k.a. Qabale, Qliphoth et magie goétique (French title)
 a.k.a. Qábalah, Qlífot y Magia Goética (Spanish title)
Astrala resor ut ur kroppen
Adulrunan och den götiska kabbalan
 a.k.a. Le rune e la kabbala (Italian title)
 a.k.a. Adulruna und die gotische Kabbala (German title)
 Revised and translated to English as: Nightside of the Runes: Uthark, Adulruna, and the Gothic Cabbala, Inner Traditions 2019
 Götisk kabbala och runisk alkemi. Johannes Bureus och den götiska esoterismen — Doctoral thesis, Stockholm University, 2010
Bland mystiker och magiker i förorten (2012)
 a.k.a. Amongst Mystics And Magicians In Stockholm (English title, 2014)
 a.k.a. L'éveil du Grand Dragon Rouge (French title)
 a.k.a. Entre Místicos y Magos en Estocolmo (Spanish title)
 a.k.a. Tra Mistici e Maghi a Stoccolma (Italian title), Hekate Edizioni 2020

Notes

Further reading

External links 
 

1972 births
Living people
20th-century occultists
21st-century occultists
Esotericists
Left-Hand Path
Stockholm University alumni
Swedish male writers
Swedish occultists
Swedish songwriters
Therion (band) members
Western esotericism scholars